Bror Erik Alvar Bladström (29 March 1918 – 21 May 1998) was a Swedish sprint canoeist who competed in the late 1930s. He won a gold medal in the folding K-2 10000 m event at the 1936 Summer Olympics, where he was the youngest competitor, aged 18.

Bladström also won a silver medal in the same event at the 1938 ICF Canoe Sprint World Championships in Vaxholm.

References

External links
DatabaseOlympics.com profile

1918 births
1998 deaths
Canoeists at the 1936 Summer Olympics
Olympic canoeists of Sweden
Olympic gold medalists for Sweden
Swedish male canoeists
Olympic medalists in canoeing
ICF Canoe Sprint World Championships medalists in kayak
Medalists at the 1936 Summer Olympics
People from Västervik Municipality
Sportspeople from Kalmar County
20th-century Swedish people